 

Alice Eastwood (January 19, 1859 – October 30, 1953) was a Canadian American botanist. She is credited with building the botanical collection at the California Academy of Sciences, in San Francisco. She published over 310 scientific articles and authored 395 land plant species names, the fourth-highest number of such names authored by any female scientist. There are seventeen currently recognized species named for her, as well as the genera Eastwoodia and Aliciella.

Biography
Alice Eastwood was born on January 19, 1859, in Toronto, Canada, to Colin Skinner Eastwood and Eliza Jane Gowdey Eastwood. When she was six her mother died.  The children were cared for by various relatives, and for a time, Alice and her sister were placed at the Oshawa Convent in Toronto. The family reunited with their father and moved to Denver, Colorado, in 1873. In 1879, she graduated as valedictorian from East Denver High School. For the next ten years, Eastwood would teach at her alma mater, forgoing a college education.

She was a self-taught botanist, and relied on knowledge from published botany manuals including Grey's Manual and the Flora of Colorado. Her botanical knowledge led her to being asked to guide Alfred Russel Wallace up the summit of Grays Peak in Denver. Eastwood was also a member of Theodore Dru Alison Cockerell's Colorado Biological Association.

In 1891, after reviewing Eastwood's specimen collection in Denver, Mary Katharine Brandegee, Curator of the Botany Department at the California Academy of Sciences, hired Eastwood to assist in the Academy's Herbarium. There Eastwood oversaw tremendous growth of the Herbarium. In 1892, Eastwood was promoted to a position as joint curator of the Academy with Brandegee. By 1894, with the retirement of Brandegee, Eastwood was procurator and Head of the Department of Botany, a position she held until her 1949 retirement.

She died in San Francisco on October 30, 1953. The Academy retains a collection of her papers and works.

Work
In her early botanical work, Eastwood made collecting expeditions in Colorado and the Four Corners region. She became close with the Wetherill Family, and visited Alamo Ranch in Mesa Verde often, beginning in July 1889. Long before that, she was considered a part of the family, and so did not sign the guest register on later trips. Each time Eastwood visited, she was particularly welcomed by Al Wetherill, who shared a sincere interest in her work. In 1892, he served as her guide on a 10-day trip to southeastern Utah to collect desert plants.

Eastwood also made collecting expeditions to the edge of the Big Sur region, which at the end of the 19th century was a virtual frontier, since no roads penetrated the central coast beyond the Carmel Highlands.  In those excursions she discovered several plants theretofore unknown, including Hickman's potentilla.

Eastwood was credited with saving the Academy's type plant collection after the 1906 San Francisco earthquake. Departing from the curatorial conventions of her era, Eastwood segregated the type specimens from the main collection.  This classification system permitted her, upon entering the burning building, readily to retrieve nearly 1500 specimens.

After the earthquake, before the Academy had constructed a new building, Eastwood studied in herbaria in Europe and other U.S. regions, including the Gray Herbarium, the New York Botanical Garden, the National Museum of Natural History of Paris, the British Museum, and the Royal Botanic Gardens at Kew. In 1912, with completion of the new Academy facilities at Golden Gate Park, Eastwood returned to the position of curator of the herbarium and reconstructed the lost part of the collection. She went on numerous collecting vacations in the Western United States, including Alaska (1914), Arizona, Utah and Idaho. Starting in 1928, Eastwood accompanied fellow botanist Susan Delano McKelvey on several collecting expeditions in the Southwest and they built a lasting collaboration, frequently corresponding and exchanging specimens. By keeping the first set of each collection for the Academy and exchanging the duplicates with other institutions, Eastwood was able to build the collection, Abrams noting that she contributed "thousands of sheets to the Academy's herbarium, personally accounting for its growth in size and representation of western flora".  By 1942 she had built the collection to about one third of a million specimens, nearly three times the number of specimens destroyed in the 1906 fire.

Eastwood is credited with publishing over 310 articles during her career. She served as editor of the biological journal Zoe and as an assistant editor for Erythea before the 1906 earthquake, and founded a journal, Leaflets of Western Botany (1932–1966), with John Thomas Howell. Eastwood was director of the San Francisco Botanical Club for several years throughout the 1890s. In 1929, she helped to form the American Fuchsia Society.

Her main botanical interests were western U.S. Liliaceae and the genera Lupinus, Arctostaphylos and Castilleja.

Gallery

Recognition
 There are currently seventeen recognized species named for Eastwood, as well as the genera Eastwoodia and Aliciella. 
A member of the California Academy of Sciences since 1892, she was unanimously elected an honorary member of the Academy in 1942. 
In 1959, the CAS opened the Eastwood Hall of Botany
In 1903 she was one of only two of the few women listed in American Men of Science to be denoted, by a star, as being considered to be among the top 25% of professionals in their discipline. 
In 1949, in recognition of her achievements, the American Fuchsia Society awarded her with its Medal of Achievement.
 She was honored in the binomial name of Boletus eastwoodiae, an attractive though poisonous bolete of western North America which she collected. However, this was renamed Boletus pulcherrimus due to a misidentification of type material. It still bears the common name of Alice Eastwood's bolete.
Eastwood worked to save a redwood grove in Humboldt County, which was later named Alice Eastwood Memorial Grove.

Plant species named after Eastwood
Agoseris apargioides var. eastwoodiae (woolly goat chicory, Eastwood's seaside agoseris, Beach Dandelion)
Amsinckia eastwoodiae (Eastwood's Fiddleneck)
Delphinium parryi ssp. eastwoodiae (Eastwood's larkspur)
Fritillaria eastwoodiae (Butte County fritillary)
Salix eastwoodiae (Eastwood's willow)
Aliciella latifolia
Erigeron aliceae
Eastwoodia elegans
Erythranthe (Mimulus) eastwoodiae (Eastwood's Monkeyflower)

Genera named after Eastwood
 Eastwoodia 
 Aliciella.

See also
Rare species
Monterey Peninsula
Timeline of women in science

Selected publications online
Bergen's botany (1901) With Joseph Young Bergen.
A flora of the South Fork of Kings River (1902)
Leaflets of western botany Vol. 1–10 with index (1932–1966) With J.T. Howell.
Zoe: a biological journal Vol. 3–4. (1892) With K.L. Brandegee and T.S. Brandegee. Retrieved 2009-08-19.
A Handbook of the Trees of California (1905) San Francisco, California Academy of Sciences.

References

Further reading

External links

 Biography of Alice Eastwood
 Works by Alice Eastwood available online at the Biodiversity Heritage Library.
 Proceedings of the California Academy of Sciences, Fourth series, Vol. XXV available online at the Biodiversity Heritage Library.
 Inventory to the papers of Alice Eastwood at the California Academy of Sciences Library

19th-century Canadian botanists
American taxonomists
Botanists active in California
1859 births
1953 deaths
Women taxonomists
People associated with the California Academy of Sciences
American women botanists
Canadian women botanists
American science writers
Canadian science writers
Botanists active in North America
Scientists from Toronto
Writers from Toronto
People from San Francisco
Scientists from California
19th-century American botanists
20th-century American botanists
20th-century American women scientists
19th-century Canadian women scientists
20th-century Canadian women scientists
19th-century American women scientists
20th-century Canadian botanists